Carmen Ryheul (born 13 April, 1971) is a Belgian politician and a member of the Flemish Parliament for the Vlaams Belang party.

Biography

Ryheul was born in Élisabethville in the Belgian Congo (now Lubumbashi in the Democratic Republic of Congo) in 1971. She worked as a market coordinator for a travel agency until 2014 and then as a marketing manager for a space sunshade manufacturing company based in Gullegem until her election to the Flemish Parliament. 

Ryheul was elected as a councilor for Vlaams Belang in Kortrijk in 2019 where she also serves on the party's board. In May 2019, she was elected to the Flemish Parliament for the VB. In the Flemish parliament, she serves on the committee for Environment, Nature, Spatial Planning and Energy.

References 

1971 births
Living people
Vlaams Belang politicians
Members of the Flemish Parliament
21st-century Belgian politicians